Mhlume Airfield  is an airstrip serving Mhlume, an agricultural town in the Lubombo Region of Eswatini. The runway is on the northwest corner of the town.

The Mhlume non-directional beacon (Ident: HL) is located on the field.

See also
Transport in Eswatini
List of airports in Eswatini

References

External links
 OpenStreetMap - Mhlume
 OurAirports - Mhlume
 FallingRain - Mhlume
 
 Google Earth

Airports in Eswatini